Several ships have been named Francisco Morazan.

, a cargo ship wrecked on South Manitou Island in the Great Lakes in 1960.
, a Liberty ship

See also
FNH General Francisco Morazán (1402), a coastal patrol vessel in the Honduran Navy

Ship names